Nuestra Belleza Durango 2012, was a beauty contest held at the Teatro Ricardo Castro in Durango, Durango, Mexico on June 14, 2012. At the conclusion of the final night of competition, Ana Victoria Sánchez of Durango City was crowned the winner. Sánchez was crowned by outgoing Nuestra Belleza Durango titleholder, Mónica Ayala. Eight contestants competed for the title.

Results

Placements

Special awards

Judges
 Melina Carrete
Carmen Saláis
Ofelia Correa - Regional coordinator of Nuestra Belleza México
Patricia Brogeras - Regional coordinator of Nuestra Belleza México
Marcela Máynez - Nuestra Belleza Durango 2009
Carlo Eduardo Rico - Televisa producer
Sonia García

Background music
Orlando Reséndiz

Contestants

References

External links
 

Nuestra Belleza México